The 2006–07 season was an overall unsuccessful time for Futbol Club Barcelona in almost all competitions. Although the team managed to snatch the Supercopa de España, and finish second in the domestic league, a lot more was expected from the team that had been European champion. It started with the team's defeat at the final of the 2006 FIFA Club World Cup Final near the end of 2006, and the team did worse in 2007. This was the first of two bad seasons for the club, which led to great changes in the roster and direction. This also marks both the last season FC Barcelona wore a jersey without a sponsor and the first time a sponsor appeared in it: UNICEF (this was a non-commercial agreement).

Events
 30 June: Barça has reached the highest membership ever, with 156,366 members.

Squad information
Carles Puyol, Lionel Messi, and Ronaldinho were selected as part of FIFPro World XI for the 2006–07 season.

Transfers

In

Total expenditure:  €31 million.

Out

Total income:   €13 million.

Expenditure:  €18 million.

Squad stats

Coaching staff

Players used from youth system

Appearances excluding Catalonia Cup

Catalonia Cup

Source: FC Barcelona
Only competitive matches.
All players from FC Barcelona B unless expressed.
EU = if holds or not a European Union passport; Country: 1st flag=country of birth, 2nd flag=country that plays for internationally (if different); N = number on jersey; P = Position; Name = Name on jersey (for full name, pause the mouse pointer on the name); App = Appearances;   GS = Game started; SB = Used as Substitute;

Kit

|
|
|

Kit information
Home: The new home kit adorned the more wider stripes for the first time since 1994–95 season. The home shorts were reverted to usual blue after one season utilized the unusual claret shorts. The home socks were blue and clarets
Away: The new away kit featured a papaya orange colour that evoked memories of 1992 European Cup glory. The new feature of the away kit was the blue and claret detailing. 
Third: Previous season's away kit were retained as a third kit as an alternate choice for certain away games.

Other information

|-
|Profit || €19.5 million

Competitions

Supercopa de España

UEFA Super Cup

FIFA Club World Cup

La Liga

Classification

Results by round

Matches

Points evolution 

Source: LPF

Position evolution 

Source: LPF

UEFA Champions League

Group stage

Knockout phase

Round of 16

Competitive results

Friendly

Results

See also
FC Barcelona
2006–07 UEFA Champions League
2006–07 La Liga
2006–07 Copa del Rey

References

External links
 
 FCBarcelonaweb.co.uk English Speaking FC Barcelona Supporters
 ESPNsoccernet: Barcelona team Page 
 FC Barcelona (Spain) profile
 uefa.com - UEFA Champions League
 Web Oficial de la Liga de Fútbol Profesional
 
 

FC Barcelona seasons
Barcelona